The United States Post Office is a historic building in Pawnee City, Nebraska. It was built in 1940–1941, and designed in the Classical Revival style by architect Louis A. Simon. Inside, there is a mural by Kenneth Evett, completed in 1942. The building has been listed on the National Register of Historic Places since May 11, 1992.

References

External links

Post office buildings on the National Register of Historic Places in Nebraska
National Register of Historic Places in Pawnee County, Nebraska
Colonial Revival architecture in Nebraska
Government buildings completed in 1942
1942 establishments in Nebraska